The Sahalee Players Championship is an annual amateur golf tournament. It has been played since 1992 at the Sahalee Country Club in Sammamish, Washington. The event will not be played from 2020 to 2022 and will return in 2023 as a collegiate event.

Winners

2020 Canceled
2019 Joe Highsmith
2018 Cole Madey
2017 Sahith Theegala
2016 No tournament – hosted 2016 Women's PGA Championship
2015 Corey Pereira
2014 Mark Anguiano
2013 Andrew Yun
2012 Kevin Penner
2011 Chris Williams
2010 Peter Uihlein
2009 Nick Taylor
2008 Trent Whitekiller
2007 Daniel Summerhays
2006 Kyle Stanley
2005 Travis Bertoni
2004 Ryan Moore
2003 Brien Davis
2002 No tournament – hosted 2002 WGC-NEC Invitational
2001 Jason Hartwick
2000 Ryan Lavoie
1999 Michael Harris
1998 No tournament – hosted 1998 PGA Championship
1997 Arron Oberholser
1996 Jason Gore
1995 David Lebeck
1994 Chris Stutts
1993 Casey Martin
1992 Doug Duchateau

References

External links
Official site
List of winners
Sahalee Country Club

Amateur golf tournaments in the United States
Golf in Washington (state)
Sammamish, Washington
Recurring sporting events established in 1992
1992 establishments in Washington (state)